Arturo Woodman Pollit (born October 16, 1931 in Piura) is a Peruvian engineer and politician. He was National Unity's candidate for First Vice President of the 2006 general election, as the running mate of Lourdes Flores Nano. The ticket placed third and failed to qualify in the run-off.

He is the president of the Peruvian Sports Institute, having successfully led the organization of the 2004 Copa América and the 2005 U-17 World Championship.

References

Peruvian people of English descent
1931 births
Living people
National Unity (Peru) politicians
Peruvian engineers